Alfred David Benjamin (August 9, 1848 January 8, 1900) was an Australian-born businessman and philanthropist.

Benjamin immigrated to Canada in 1873 and entered into the wholesale hardware business with his father's financial backing. He became a partner in M. and L. Samuel and Company and, after the death of Lewis Samuel in 1887, he became the leader of the company.

His success in a variety of business ventures allowed him to pursue various philanthropic goals. His most important contribution was to the Jewish community in Toronto, Ontario, where he was the leader of the Holy Blossom Temple congregation and a major contributor to the new synagogue in 1897.

See also

 Lists of Australians
 List of people from Toronto
 List of philanthropists

References 
 Biography at the Dictionary of Canadian Biography Online.

Place of birth missing
Place of death missing
1848 births
1900 deaths
19th-century Australian businesspeople
19th-century Canadian businesspeople
Australian chief executives
Australian Jews
Australian emigrants to Canada
Businesspeople from Toronto
Canadian chief executives
Jewish Canadian philanthropists
19th-century Australian philanthropists